Radizel is a settlement in the Municipality of Hoče–Slivnica in northeastern Slovenia. It lies at the eastern foothills of the Pohorje range south of Maribor. The area is part of the traditional region of Styria. The entire  municipality is now included in the Drava Statistical Region.

References

External links

Radizel on Geopedia

Populated places in the Municipality of Hoče-Slivnica